Kürdborakı (also, Kürdboragi, Kyurdboragi, and Kyurtboragy) is a village and municipality in the Barda Rayon of Azerbaijan. It has a population of 693.

Climate 
Kürdborakı is a steppe climate, with an average of 379 mm (about 15 in.) of precipitation annually. Its low rainfall classifies it as a BSk according to the Köppen-Geiger classification system.

References 

Populated places in Barda District